The Canadian Institute of Ecology and Evolution is a national organization that sponsors research on natural systems and facilitates communication on the ecological and evolutionary aspects of public policy.  The CIEE is operated by a consortium of Canadian universities, including Carleton University, McGill University, University of British Columbia and the University of Toronto.  In addition, CIEE is supported by the Canadian Society for Ecology and Evolution, the national learned society. Typical programs involve research on invasive weeds, species and ecosystems at risk, and adaptations to climate change.

Rationale
Individual research groups in ecology and evolution engage in programs of discovery that are motivated by broad conceptual questions. By necessity, however, each group focuses on one or a few biological systems—a species, an ecosystem, a gene, a lineage—whose particularities may obscure underlying generalities. CIEE programs bring together top scientists working on diverse systems to pool data and do the higher level analyses that can resolve disparate interpretations, yield novel insights, catalyze theory development and identify promising new areas of inquiry. In short, CIEE seeks to accelerate scientific progress by fostering working interactions in ways that standard organizations cannot.

History and organization
First steps to establish the CIEE were taken in 2007 at the inaugural meeting of the Canadian Society for Ecology and Evolution, the national learned society. In May 2008, after a nationwide competition that received entries from some of Canada's most prestigious universities, the Society's Governing Council selected the proposal from the University of Toronto to house and operate the CIEE at the Koffler Scientific Reserve under the direction of Prof. Arthur E. Weis. In 2012 Dr. Peter Leavitt was appointed Director and administration of CIEE moved to the University of Regina (while programming continued to be distributed around the country).  the CIEE was housed at the Institute of Environmental Change and Society (IECS) at the University of Regina.  the CIEE is located at the UBC Biodiversity Research Centre in Vancouver. Diane Srivastava was appointed Director in 2017.

Scientific programs
The CIEE sponsor the following types of activities:

Thematic Programs bring together working groups of scientists to synthesize results, explore alternative approaches and identify promising areas of inquiry.  The first such program was the 2008 workshop, An Interim Scientific Assessment of the Present and Projected Effectiveness of the Canadian Species at Risk Act.  A groups of scientists from across Canada evaluated the use of scientific information in the act's implementation.  These findings were presented in testimony before the parliamentary Standing Committee on the Environment and Sustainable Development in June 2010.

Synergy Workshops are short-term gatherings that foster communication and collaboration among scientists from diverse fields of study. The 2009 symposium Adaptive Movement of Interacting Species gathered an international roster of ecologists and applied mathematicians.  They explored theoretical representations of foraging and escape behaviors that can be incorporated into models to predict the dynamics of predator-prey and similar sorts of linked species systems.

Visiting Fellows, typically on sabbatical leave, are hosted at CIEE for periods of several months to a year.  Here they engage in synthesis research on topics in ecology and evolution.

The CIEE plans to offer advanced training through Graduate Mini-Courses with a focus on transdisciplinary topics not covered in typical academic settings.

References

External links
Canadian Society for Ecology and Evolution 
Koffler Scientific Reserve  

Environmental organizations based in Canada